The One Definition Rule (ODR) is an important rule of the C++ programming language that prescribes that classes/structs and non-inline functions cannot have more than one definition in the entire program and template and types cannot have more than one definition by translation unit. It is defined in the ISO C++ Standard (ISO/IEC 14882) 2003, at section 3.2.

Summary 
In short, the ODR states that:

In any translation unit, a template, type, function, or object can have no more than one definition. Some of these can have any number of declarations. A definition provides an instance.
In the entire program, an object or non-inline function cannot have more than one definition; if an object or function is used, it must have exactly one definition. You can declare an object or function that is never used, in which case you don't have to provide a definition. In no event can there be more than one definition.
Some things, like types, templates, and extern inline functions, can be defined in more than one translation unit. For a given entity, each definition must have the same sequence of tokens. Non-extern objects and functions in different translation units are different entities, even if their names and types are the same.

Some violations of the ODR must be diagnosed by the compiler. Other violations, particularly those that span translation units, are not required to be diagnosed.

Examples 
In general, a translation unit shall contain no more than one definition of any class type. In this example, two definitions of the class type C occur in the same translation unit. This typically occurs if a header file is included twice by the same source file without appropriate header guards.

class C {}; // first definition of C
class C {}; // error, second definition of C
 
In the following, forming a pointer to S or defining a function taking a reference to S are examples of legal constructs, because they do not require the type of S to be complete. Therefore, a definition is not required. 

Defining an object of type S, a function taking an argument of type S, or using S in a sizeof expression are examples of contexts where S must be complete, and therefore require a definition.

struct S;     // declaration of S
S * p;        // ok, no definition required
void f(S&);   // ok, no definition required
void f(S*);   // ok, no definition required 
S f();        // ok, no definition required - this is a function declaration only!

S s;          // error, definition required
sizeof(S);    // error, definition required

More than one definition 

In certain cases, there can be more than one definition of a type or a template. A program consisting of multiple header files and source files will typically have more than one definition of a type, but not more than one definition per translation unit.

If a program contains more than one definition of a type, then each definition must be equivalent.

Definitions of static const data members 

In pre-standard C++, all static data members required a definition outside of their class. However, during the C++ standardization process it was decided to lift this requirement for static const integral members. The intent was to allow uses such as:
struct C {
  static const int N = 10;
};
char data[C::N]; // N "used" without out-of-class definition
without a namespace scope definition for N.

Nevertheless, the wording of the 1998 C++ standard still required a definition if the member was used in the program. This included the member appearing anywhere except as the operand to sizeof or typeid, effectively making the above ill-formed.

This was identified as a defect, and the wording was adjusted to allow such a member to appear anywhere a constant expression is required, without requiring an out-of-class definition. This includes array bounds, case expressions, static member initializers, and nontype template arguments.

struct C {
  static const int N = 10;
  static const int U = N; // Legal per C++03
};

char data[C::N]; // Legal per C++03

template<int> struct D;

template<> struct D<C::N> {}; // Legal per C++03

However, using a static const integral member anywhere except where an integral constant-expression is required, requires a definition:

struct C {
  static const int N = 10;
};

int main() {
  int i = C::N; // Ill-formed in C++03. Definition of C::N required.
}

This requirement was relaxed in a later standard, C++11.

Example showing unexpected side effects 
We need 4 files: "odr.h", "main.cpp", "odr1.cpp", "odr2.cpp"

The acronym "odr" here is short for "One Definition Rule".

odr.h:
// abstract base class
class CBase {
public:
	virtual void xxx() = 0;
	virtual ~CBase() = default;
};

extern CBase *odr1_create();
extern CBase *odr2_create();

main.cpp
#include "odr.h"

int main(int argc, char **argv)
{
	CBase *o1 = odr1_create();
	CBase *o2 = odr2_create();
	o1->xxx();
	o2->xxx();
}

odr1.cpp
#include <stdio.h>
#include "odr.h"

class CDummy : public CBase {
public:
	void xxx() override {
		printf("odr ONE dummy: Hello\n");
	}
};

CBase *odr1_create() {
	return new CDummy();
}

odr2.cpp
#include <stdio.h>
#include "odr.h"

class CDummy : public CBase {
public:
	void xxx() override {
		printf("odr TWO dummy: World\n");
	}
};

CBase *odr2_create() {
	return new CDummy();
}

Under a Linux shell to try out, compile with:
g++ -c odr1.cpp
g++ -c odr2.cpp
g++ -c main.cpp
g++ -o odr main.o odr1.o odr2.o

Under a Windows Visual Studio "Build Tools Command Prompt", compile with:
cl /c main.cpp
cl /c odr1.cpp
cl /c odr2.cpp
cl /Feodr.exe main.obj odr1.obj odr2.obj

When executed the expected output is:
odr ONE dummy: Hello
odr TWO dummy: World

But you very likely get:
odr ONE dummy: Hello
odr ONE dummy: Hello

The problem is, that the C++ linker has to figure out how to build the virtual method table for the (two different) "CDummy" classes, and that only works if the class names are different.

See also
Include directive
Include guard

References

C++
Articles with example C++ code